Number 7 Flight Army Air Corps (7 Flt AAC) was an independent flight of the British Army's Army Air Corps, latterly based at the British garrison at Medicina Lines in Seria, Brunei, on the island of Borneo.

History

On 24 December 1962, 7 Recce Flight AAC then moved Brunei Darussalam on the island of Borneo, and remained there until 31 December 1966, when it was disbanded.

It was part of the Berlin Infantry Brigade. It was disbanded October 1994, and then returning to Borneo, it reformed on 1 November 1994 at Seria in Brunei Darussalam, where it supported the resident infantry battalion from the Brigade of Gurkhas, and the Training Team Brunei (TTB), which runs jungle warfare training courses. The flight used Bell 212 AH1 and AH3 light helicopters.

On , the flight was expanded and raised to squadron size, and consequently re-designated as No. 667 Squadron AAC.

See also
Royal Gurkha Rifles
British Army Jungle Warfare Training School
List of Army Air Corps aircraft units

References

Army Air Corps independent flights
Brunei–United Kingdom relations